The 1960 Major League Baseball All-Star Game was the 28th playing of the midsummer classic between the all-stars of the American League (AL) and National League (NL), the two leagues comprising Major League Baseball. The game was held on July 11, 1960, at Municipal Stadium in Kansas City, Missouri the home of the Kansas City Athletics of the American League. The game resulted in the National League defeating the American League 5–3.

A second all-star game was played two days later on July 13 at Yankee Stadium in New York City.

Rosters
Players in italics have since been inducted into the National Baseball Hall of Fame.

American League

National League

-x – Injured and could not play
-y – Injury replacement

Game
Umpires: Jim Honochick, Home Plate (AL); Tom Gorman, First Base (NL); Nestor Chylak, Second Base (AL); Dusty Boggess, Third Base (NL); Johnny Stevens, Left Field (AL); Vinnie Smith, Right Field (NL)

Starting Lineups

Game Summary

References

External links
Baseball Almanac

Major League Baseball All-Star Game
Major League Baseball All-Star Game
Major League Baseball All Star Game
July 1960 sports events in the United States
Baseball competitions in Kansas City, Missouri
20th century in Kansas City, Missouri